Gymnothorax vagrans is a moray eel found around South America. It was first named by Seale in 1917.

References

vagrans
Fish described in 1917
Taxa named by Alvin Seale